Racetams are a class of drugs that share a pyrrolidone nucleus. Some, such as piracetam, aniracetam, oxiracetam, pramiracetam and phenylpiracetam are considered nootropics.  Others such as levetiracetam, brivaracetam, and seletracetam are anticonvulsants.

Mechanism
There is no universally accepted mechanism of action for racetams. Racetams generally show negligible affinity for common central nervous system receptors, but modulation of central neurotransmitters, including acetylcholine and glutamate, has been reported. Although aniracetam and nebracetam show affinity for muscarinic receptors, only nefiracetam demonstrates nanomolar interactions. Modification of membrane-located mechanisms of central signal transduction is another hypothesis.

Like some ampakines, some racetams such as piracetam and aniracetam are positive allosteric modulators of the AMPA receptor.

Racetams are understood to work by allosterically modulating glutamate receptors, specifically AMPA receptors, leading to Ca2+ influx that is excitatory. Racetams are posited to enhance memory through interaction with glutamate receptors in the central nervous system.

Methylphenylpiracetam is a positive allosteric modulator of the sigma-1 receptor.

Cofactors
In studies with aged rats, marked improvement has been observed in cognitive tasks in experimental groups given piracetam. Performance was further increased when piracetam was combined with choline. Evidence in studies with rats has indicated that the potency of piracetam is increased when administered with choline.

List of Racetams

Legality

Australia 
All racetams are schedule 4 substances in Australia under the Poisons Standard (February 2020). A schedule 4 substance is classified as "Prescription Only Medicine, or Prescription Animal Remedy – Substances, the use or supply of which should be by or on the order of persons permitted by State or Territory legislation to prescribe and should be available from a pharmacist on prescription."

References 

 
Chemical classes of psychoactive drugs